The 2018–19 Ural season was the club's sixth successive season that the club played in the Russian Premier League, the highest tier of association football in Russia. They finished the season in 10th place, whilst they were runners up in the Russian Cup to Lokomotiv Moscow.

Squad

Out on loan

Transfers

Summer

In:

Out:

Winter

In:

Out:

Competitions

Russian Premier League

Results by round

Results

League table

Russian Cup

Final

Squad statistics

Appearances and goals

|-
|colspan="14"|Players away from the club on loan:

|-
|colspan="14"|Players who left Ural Yekaterinburg during the season:

|}

Goal scorers

Disciplinary record

References

External links

FC Ural Yekaterinburg seasons
Ural Yekaterinburg